"No Hands" is a song recorded by American rapper Waka Flocka Flame featuring fellow American rappers Roscoe Dash and Wale from the former's debut studio album, Flockaveli (2010). It was written by the artists alongside producer Drumma Boy. It was leaked in May 2010 before it was officially released in August. The single entered the Billboard Hot 100 chart at number 45 and peaked at number 13.

Music video
The music video was directed by Motion Family and was released on August 17, 2010.

Remixes
T-Pain made a remix titled "No Hands (T-Mix)". Chamillionaire made a freestyle to the beat titled "After the Super Bowl". R&B girl group RichGirl created a remix to the song, released on their Fall in Love with RichGirl mixtape, in which member Brave raps. In 2011, Cold Blank released a remix titled "No Hands – Cold Blank's Dirty Radio Mix". British singer Neon Hitch uploaded a cover version of the song to her official YouTube page in September 2011. A remix was made featuring Japanese pop star Kyary Pamyu Pamyu's "Pon Pon Pon". Another remix, titled "No Handz", was created by CRNKN and uploaded to the Trap City YouTube channel on December 25, 2012.

Charts and certifications

Weekly charts

Year-end charts

References

2010 singles
2010 songs
Roscoe Dash songs
song recordings produced by Drumma Boy
songs written by Roscoe Dash
songs written by Waka Flocka Flame
songs written by Wale (rapper)
Waka Flocka Flame songs
Wale (rapper) songs
Asylum Records singles